Arsenyev is a town in Primorsky Krai, Russia.

Arsenyev (masculine) or Arsenyeva (feminine) may also refer to:
Dmitry Arsenyev (1832–1915), Russian admiral
Konstantin Ivanovich Arsenyev (1789–1865), Russian geographer and historian
Konstantin Konstantinovich Arsenyev (1837–1919), Russian lawyer, essayist, and political activist
Nikolay Dmitrievich Arsenyev (1739-1796), Russian major-general
Nikolay Arsenyev (1888–1977), Russian/Soviet religious philosopher and writer
Vladimir Klavdiyevich Arsenyev (1872–1930), Russian/Soviet explorer, scientist, and writer
Vladimir Romanovich Arsenyev (1948–2010), Soviet/Russian ethnographer and writer